Noah Jackson (born April 14, 1951) is a former American football player who played offensive lineman for ten seasons between 1975 and 1984 for the Chicago Bears and the Tampa Bay Buccaneers. Previously, he played three seasons for the Toronto Argonauts of the Canadian Football League (CFL). Afterwards, he was traded by the Baltimore Colts to the Bears for a seventh-round draft pick in the 1975 NFL Draft.

References

1951 births
Living people
People from Jacksonville Beach, Florida
Players of American football from Florida
American football offensive guards
Tampa Spartans football players
Chicago Bears players
Tampa Bay Buccaneers players
American players of Canadian football
Canadian football offensive linemen
Toronto Argonauts players
Sportspeople from Duval County, Florida
Duncan U. Fletcher High School alumni